United States v. Eichman, 496 U.S. 310 (1990), was a United States Supreme Court case that by a 5-4 decision invalidated a federal law against flag desecration as a violation of free speech under the First Amendment. It was argued together with the case United States v. Haggerty.  It built on the opinion handed down in the Court's decision the prior year in Texas v. Johnson (1989), which invalidated on First Amendment grounds a Texas state statute banning flag burning.

Background
In response to Texas v. Johnson, the 101st Congress passed the Flag Protection Act of 1989, which attempted to circumvent the Johnson ruling by prohibiting mistreatment of the flag without regard to any message being conveyed. On the day that the law took effect, protests were staged around the nation. Demonstrators at two of these incidents, in Seattle and Washington, D.C., were arrested and charged under the revised statute.

In Seattle, flags were burned at a demonstration organized by the Vietnam Veterans Against the War Anti-Imperialist outside the Capitol Hill post office shortly after midnight, moments after the law took effect. No one was arrested during the demonstration, but four people identified from photographs were later charged with violating the federal Flag Protection Act of 1989: Mark Haggerty, Jennifer Campbell, Darius Strong and Carlos Garza. None of the four were members or supporters of VVAW-AI or the Revolutionary Communist Party. None of the four had been among the organizers of the demonstration or had previously known each other. 

In Washington, D.C., Gregory Lee Johnson, the defendant in Texas v. Johnson, staged a protest together with three companions – artists Dread Scott and Shawn Eichman and Vietnam veteran David Blalock – by burning flags on the steps of the United States Capitol building before a crowd of reporters and photographers. Scott had recently aroused controversy with a "flag on the floor" exhibit at the Art Institute of Chicago. Eichman was a member of the Coalition Opposed to Censorship in the Arts, and Blalock was a member of the Vietnam Veterans Against the War Anti-Imperialist. All four were supporters of the Revolutionary Communist Party and/or the Revolutionary Communist Youth Brigade. On the day of the protest they released a statement calling for others to express opposition to "compulsory patriotism" by burning the flag.

In both cases, federal district judges in Seattle and Washington, D.C. dismissed charges brought against the protesters, citing Texas v. Johnson. U.S. attorneys appealed the decisions directly to the Supreme Court. Because the Flag Protection Act called for expedited review, the two cases were consolidated into United States v. Eichman (1990), which would serve as a test case for the amended statute.

Opinion of the Court
In a 5-4 decision by Justice Brennan joined by Marshall, Blackmun, Scalia, and Kennedy; with 
Stevens, Chief Justice Rehnquist, White, and O'Connor dissenting (the same as in Texas v. Johnson); the Court held that the federal government, like the states, cannot prosecute a person for desecration of a United States flag, because to do so would be inconsistent with the First Amendment. The Government conceded that desecration of the flag constitutes expressive conduct and enjoys the First Amendment's full protection. It is clear that the "Government's asserted interest" in protecting the "physical integrity" of a privately owned flag in order "to preserve the flag's status as a symbol of the Nation" and certain national ideals, is related to the suppression, and concerned with the content, of free expression.

The majority wrote that mere destruction or disfigurement of a symbol's physical manifestation does not diminish or otherwise affect the symbol itself. The Government's interest is implicated only when a person's "treatment of the flag communicates a message" to others that is inconsistent with the identified ideals of the flag. The precise language of the Act's prohibitions confirms Congress' interest in the communicative impact of flag destruction, since each of the specified terms – with the possible exception of "burns" – unmistakably connotes disrespectful treatment of the flag and suggests a "focus on those acts likely to damage the flag's symbolic value." This is further supported by the Act's explicit exemption for disposal of worn or soiled flags, which the Act protects from prosecution since disposing a worn or soiled flag does not desecrate the flag's symbolic nature. Thus, the Act is struck down as its restriction on expressive conduct cannot "be justified without reference to the content of the regulated speech." It must therefore be subjected to "the most exacting scrutiny," which cannot justify its infringement on First Amendment rights. While flag desecration – like virulent ethnic and religious epithets, vulgar repudiations of the draft, and scurrilous caricatures – is deeply offensive to many, "the Government may not prohibit the expression of an idea simply because society finds the idea itself offensive or disagreeable."

See Texas v. Johnson for the gist of the dissenting opinion.

Subsequent developments

On remand, Eichman's case was dismissed, as she and her fellow defendants had only been charged with flag desecration. However, the defendants in the Haggerty case had faced an additional charge of destruction of government property, as the burned flag was alleged to have been stolen from Seattle's Capitol Hill Post Office. On those charges, all four Seattle defendants pleaded guilty and were fined. Carlos Garza and Darius Strong each served three days in jail.

When Republicans retook control of Congress in 1995 for the 104th session, the Flag Desecration Amendment was first proposed, which would grant the federal government the authority to proscribe flag burning. A resolution for this Amendment passed the House in every session from the 104th until the 109th Congress, but never got past the Senate (in the most recent vote in 2006 it failed by one vote 66-34), and has not been considered since.

See also
 List of United States Supreme Court cases, volume 496
 Flag desecration
Street v. New York

Notes

References

External links

First Amendment Library entry archive on United States v. Eichman

United States Supreme Court cases
United States Supreme Court cases of the Rehnquist Court
United States Free Speech Clause case law
1990 in United States case law
Flag controversies in the United States
American Civil Liberties Union litigation